Mark Cameron (born October 10, 1952) is an American athlete.  He was an Olympic weightlifter for the United States.

Personal information
Cameron was born in Clinton, Massachusetts in 1952. As a grown adult, Cameron stood at 5 foot 10 inches and weighed 240 pounds.

Organizations
Cameron was affiliated with the Central Falls Weightlifting Club (RI) and later with the York Barbell Club in York, Pennsylvania.

Weightlifting achievements
Bronze Medalist in Senior World Championships (1977)
Pan Am Games Champion (1979)
Silver Medalist in Pan Am Games (1975)
Senior National Champion (1975–1980)
Olympic Games team member (1976 and 1980)
Lightest and youngest American to clean and jerk over 500 pounds.
Senior American record holder in clean and jerk (1972–1992).
Served as Chairman of the Board for USA Weightlifting (2008–2010).

References

External links
Mark Cameron - Hall of Fame at Weightlifting Exchange
Sports Illustrated Article

1952 births
Living people
People from Clinton, Massachusetts
Sportspeople from Worcester County, Massachusetts
American male weightlifters
Olympic weightlifters of the United States
Weightlifters at the 1976 Summer Olympics
Weightlifters at the 1979 Pan American Games
Weightlifters at the 1975 Pan American Games
Pan American Games medalists in weightlifting
Pan American Games gold medalists for the United States
Pan American Games silver medalists for the United States
Medalists at the 1975 Pan American Games
Medalists at the 1979 Pan American Games
20th-century American people
21st-century American people